M-247 is a north–south state trunkline highway in the US state of Michigan, connecting M-13 to the Bay City Recreation Area, entirely within Bangor Township. The highway carries just over 6,000 vehicles a day on average. The roadway has been part of the state trunkline highway system since the 1920s, and from 1961 until 1998, it was the highest non-Interstate highway in the state. Before it was given the M-247 designation, the roadway has been a part of M-111 and M-47.

Route description
When it meets Beaver Road, M-247 turns east leading directly into the state park and ends at its entrance. The entire roadway passes through suburban Bay City near the Saginaw Bay. None of the highway is listed on the National Highway System, a system of regionally important highways.

The Michigan Department of Transportation (MDOT) measures the traffic volumes on its highways using a calculation called average annual daily traffic (AADT). This value is an expression of the number of vehicles that use a section of roadway on any average day of the year. When the department surveyed M-247 in 2009, the southernmost section near M-13 carried 6,135 vehicles; the remainder carried 6,224 vehicles. As a subset of these figures, 190 commercial vehicles used the trunkline on average. This was an overall increase from 2008 when the sections carried 5,031 and 5,573 vehicles respectively, but a decrease from the 214 commercial vehicles.

History
By 1929, the first highway designation along the current M-247 was assigned. That first number was M-111, which lasted until 1937 when all of M-111 became part of M-47. In early 1961, the roadway changed numbers once more. This time M-47 was realigned to a former section of US Highway 10 (US 10), and the connection to the state park was assigned the M-247 designation. This was the highest highway number in the state, excluding Interstates, until the 1998 designation of M-553 in the Upper Peninsula.

Major intersections

See also

References

External links

M-247 at Michigan Highways

247
Transportation in Bay County, Michigan